Farfán is a Spanish surname. Notable people with the surname include:
Alirio Farfán, Colombian cinematographer
Aura Elena Farfán, Guatemalan human rights activist
Cristina Farfán (1846–1880), Mexican educator and writer
David Farfan (1936–before 2009), Trinidad and Tobago sailor
Gabriel Farfán (born 1988), American soccer player, twin brother of Michael
Jefferson Farfán (born 1984), Peruvian footballer, nephew of Rafael
José Martín Farfán (born 1965), Colombian cyclist
Juan Pablo Farfán (born 1985), Peruvian footballer
Marco Farfan (born 1998), American soccer player
Marcos Farfán de los Godos, Spanish explorer of Mexico and Arizona
Michael Farfan (born 1988), American soccer player, twin brother of Gabriel
Rafael Farfán (born 1975), Peruvian footballer, uncle of Jefferson
Rosa María Farfán, Mexican mathematics education researcher
Rubén Farfán (born 1991), Chilean footballer
Salvador Farfán (born 1932), Mexican footballer

See also
Farfan, a village in Iran

Spanish-language surnames